The Leland River is a short river in the U.S. state of Michigan. As the dam prevents boat traffic, launches are provided on both sides.

The river was formerly known as Carp River, a term that is still often used today.

References

Rivers of Leelanau County, Michigan
Rivers of Michigan
Tributaries of Lake Michigan